The 1996 NFL draft was the procedure by which National Football League teams selected amateur college football players. It is officially known as the NFL Annual Player Selection Meeting. The draft was held April 20–21, 1996, at the Paramount Theatre at Madison Square Garden in New York City, New York. No teams chose to claim any players in the supplemental draft that year.

On draft day, the St. Louis Rams traded running back Jerome Bettis and a third-round draft pick to the Pittsburgh Steelers in exchange for a second round pick for that year, as well as a fourth round pick the following year. The trade was made immediately after the Rams drafted Nebraska running back Lawrence Phillips. Bettis went on to have a successful career with the Steelers as well as being one of the team's most popular players, while the Rams did not have another feature back until they traded for Marshall Faulk three years later due to Phillips' off-field problems.

The draft also saw one of the longest waits for a player in attendance of the draft, as Leeland McElroy waited until being selected in the second round by the Arizona Cardinals with the 32nd pick. McElroy, who ended up being a draft bust, would set the precedent for later players who have waited while in attendance, including Ben Roethlisberger and Aaron Rodgers, who unlike McElroy would go on to successful NFL careers.

This draft is considered one of the best draft classes ever for the position of wide receiver. Keyshawn Johnson, Terry Glenn, Eddie Kennison, Marvin Harrison, Eric Moulds, Bobby Engram, Terrell Owens, Muhsin Muhammad, Amani Toomer, Jermaine Lewis, and Joe Horn have all achieved success in the pros, with all except Kennison, Engram, and Toomer having reached the Pro Bowl at least once, and a total of 26 Pro Bowl appearances for the group. In addition to the class having had several successful receivers, none of the five wide receivers drafted in the first round have been busts, as all of them spent at least a reasonable amount of time as starters in the NFL. Combined, 1996 wide receivers (through the end of the 2006 season) have totalled 7,646 receptions for 105,866 yards, eclipsing any other class by more than 1,000 receptions and 10,000 yards.

It was also one of the best draft years for middle linebackers, with Hall of Famers Ray Lewis and Zach Thomas selected. Lewis won Super Bowl XXXV with the Baltimore Ravens and was selected MVP of that game. Lewis also won Super Bowl XLVII in the final game of his career and made 13 career Pro Bowls while Thomas has made 7. Other linebackers who made at least one Pro Bowl from this draft are Tedy Bruschi, Kevin Hardy, Simeon Rice, John Mobley, and Donnie Edwards. Randall Godfrey, Earl Holmes, and Carlos Emmons also had solid careers in the league. Ironically, ESPN draft expert Mel Kiper said before the draft that it was one of the weakest for the position, which he would ultimately be proven wrong.

In contrast to its successes at wide receiver and linebacker, the 1996 draft had often been rated as the worst for quarterbacks. None of the eight drafted quarterbacks made the Pro Bowl or an All-Pro team and half did not play. , this remains the last draft without a quarterback selected in the first round. Previously, the 1988 draft had been the last with no quarterback selected in the first round.

Player selections

Notable undrafted players

|}

Hall of Famers
 Jonathan Ogden, offensive tackle from UCLA, taken 1st round 4th overall by the Baltimore Ravens. 
Inducted: Professional Football Hall of Fame class of 2013.

 Marvin Harrison, wide receiver from Syracuse, taken 1st round 19th overall by the Indianapolis Colts. 
Inducted: Professional Football Hall of Fame class of 2016.

Ray Lewis, linebacker from Miami (FL), taken 1st round 26th overall by the Baltimore Ravens.
Inducted: Professional Football Hall of Fame class of 2018.

Brian Dawkins, safety from Clemson, taken 2nd round 61st overall by the Philadelphia Eagles.
Inducted: Professional Football Hall of Fame class of 2018.

Terrell Owens, wide receiver from Chattanooga, taken 3rd round 89th overall by the San Francisco 49ers.
Inducted: Professional Football Hall of Fame class of 2018.

 Zach Thomas, linebacker from Texas Tech, taken 5th round 154th overall by the Miami Dolphins. 
Inducted: Professional Football Hall of Fame class of 2023.

Trades
In the explanations below, (D) denotes trades that took place during the 1994 Draft, while (PD) indicates trades completed pre-draft.

Round one

Round two

Round three

Round four

Round five

Round six

Round seven

Notes

References

External links
 NFL.com – 1996 Draft
 databaseFootball.com – 1996 Draft
 Pro Football Hall of Fame

National Football League Draft
Draft
NFL Draft
Madison Square Garden
NFL Draft
NFL Draft
American football in New York City
1990s in Manhattan
Sporting events in New York City